The 1998 New Zealand rugby league tour of Great Britain was a tour by the New Zealand national rugby league team. The New Zealand national rugby league team defeated Great Britain 2–0 in the three match test series.

Background
New Zealand arrived in Great Britain for the first time since the 1995 World Cup, having already lost a test series 1–2 with Australia. It was the first full tour of Great Britain by a New Zealand side since 1993.

Many of the squad, including coach Frank Endacott, had been involved in the Auckland Warriors' 1998 season, where they had finished 15th out of 20 clubs. In addition to this the Auckland Rugby League were looking to sell the club during the tour.

Squad
The squad included two sets of brothers; the Iros, Kevin and Tony and the Pauls, Robbie and Henry.

Coach: Frank Endacott (Auckland Warriors)

Fixtures
They won the first two test matches 22–16 and 36–16 before being held to a 23-all draw in the third and final test match. Australian referee Bill Harrigan controlled all three Test matches.

In the second test match Great Britain were ahead 16–8 at halftime before letting in 28 points in the second half to lose the match and the series.

Aftermath
New Zealand next competed against Great Britain in the 1999 Tri-Nations but did not tour Great Britain again until the 2000 World Cup. The next full tour was conducted in 2002 which saw a drawn test series 1-all.

The Auckland Warriors were sold to a consortium that included majority investor the Tainui tribe as well as Graham Lowe and Malcolm Boyle. Kiwi coach Frank Endacott was replaced as Warriors coach and several Kiwis left the club included Stephen Kearney, Quentin Pongia, and Kevin Iro. Endacott's next coaching assignment would be the 1999 ANZAC Test on 23 April.

References

New Zealand national rugby league team tours
Great Britain
New Zealand rugby league tour of Great Britain
New Zealand rugby league tour of Great Britain
Rugby league tours of Great Britain